Gökdere (literally "sky creek") is a place name of Turkish origin and may refer to the following places:

Gökdere (Nilüfer River tributary), spanned by Irgandı Bridge, in Bursa Province, of northwestern Turkey
 Gökdere, Amasya, a village in the central district of Amasya Province, Turkey
 Gökdere, Antalya, a village in the Antalya district of Antalya Province, Turkey
 Gökdere, Çorum, a village in Çorum district of Çorum Province, Turkey
 Gökdere, Kalecik, a village in Kalecik district of Ankara Province, Turkey
 Gökdere, Osmancık, a village in Osmancık district of Çorum Province, Turkey
 Gökdere, Palu, a village in Palu district of Elazığ Province, Turkey
 Gökdere, Gökdepe, a locality in Gökdepe district of the Ahal Region, Turkmenistan